The Zee Cine Award Best Actor in a Supporting Role- Male is chosen by a jury organized by Zee Entertainment Enterprises, and the winner is announced only at the ceremony. 

The winners are listed below:-

See also 

 Zee Cine Awards
 Bollywood
 Cinema of India

Supporting Role- Male